Crocodiles in Amsterdam or  Krokodillen in Amsterdam  is a 1990 Dutch comedy film directed by Annette Apon.

Cast
Joan Nederlof	 ... 	Gino
Yolanda Entius	... 	Nina
Hans Hoes	... 	Jacques
Marcel Musters	... 	Jerry
Trudie Lute	... 	Charlotte
Jaap ten Holt	... 	Peter
Evert van der Meulen	... 	Adje
Truus te Selle	... 	Moeder
Olga Zuiderhoek	... 	Mevrouw Top
Cahit Ölmez	... 	Alex
Khaldoun Elmecky	... 	Koos
Fried Mertens	... 	Mike
Carel Alphenaar	... 	Oom Victor
Daria Mohr	... 	Theresa
Wim Meuwissen	... 	Makelaar

External links 
 

1990 films
1990s Dutch-language films
1990 comedy films
Dutch comedy films